Deli Girls is an American band fronted by Danny Orlowski. Orlowski formed the band with producer Ray Kelly in 2013, and then Kelly left the band in April 2022. Orlowski has continued the project, working with a variety of producers.

Discography
DEM0 (2015)
deli girls (2016)
Evidence (Sweat Equity, 2017)
I Don’t Know How to Be Happy (Sweat Equity, 2019)
BOSS (2020)

References

American musical duos